Transylvania County is a county in the U.S. state of North Carolina. As of the 2020 census the population is 32,986. Its county seat is Brevard.

Transylvania County comprises the Brevard Micropolitan Statistical Area, which is also included in the Asheville-Brevard, NC CSA combined statistical area.

History
The North Carolina General Assembly apportioned Transylvania County on February 15, 1861, from lands previously attributed to neighboring Jackson and Henderson counties; it was named by representative Joseph P. Jordan. Until the early 20th century, the vast majority of Transylvania County residents subsisted through agriculture, growing staples such as potatoes and cabbage.

Beginning in the early 20th century, with Joseph Silverstein's tannery in what was renamed as Rosman in 1905, a manufacturing economy began to develop in the county. It relied on timber and related products harvested from the Pisgah National Forest. In the 1930s, Harry Straus opened a paper mill in the Pisgah Forest area; by the mid-20th century, Straus's Ecusta Paper manufacturing site provided jobs to over 3,000 local residents. During the peak industrial years of the 1950s, DuPont had a factory in the county, employing nearly 1,000 more residents.

In the following decades, Brevard College and its namesake town each grew at dramatic rates. The Brevard Music Center and its summer Brevard Music Festival began to attract musicians and enthusiasts from around the country to Transylvania County.

Since the late 20th century, Transylvania County's economy has changed. Many of the manufacturing operations went defunct or moved offshore for cheap labor, including Ecusta and DuPont. Since then, the county has worked to reshape its economy around the growing summer and winter tourism industry in Appalachia.

Geography

Transylvania County contains the primary headwaters of the French Broad River, locally called North Fork, West Fork, East Fork, and Middle Fork. Since the county's northern and western boundaries follow mountain ridges, all these tributaries originate from sources in the county. The French Broad flows primarily east and northward through the county into Henderson County.

The county's northern border follows the ridge line proximate to the Blue Ridge Parkway, and the southern border mostly follows the Eastern Continental Divide, from the border of Henderson County and South Carolina, westward to near US 178 and Jackson County. The headwaters of Lake Toxaway lie south of the Eastern Continental Divide, becoming the Toxaway River, descending rapidly through Gorges State Park and into Lake Jocassee on the county's southern edge. This area, known as the Cane Brake, is difficult to access from North Carolina due to the steep slope of the trails in Gorges State Park, but can be reached more easily via the Foothills Trail from South Carolina.

Transylvania County is known as the "Land of Waterfalls", due to it having over 250 waterfalls. This is due to a combination of its high precipitation and location on the Blue Ridge Escarpment. Notable waterfalls in the county include Looking Glass Falls, Moore Cove Falls, Rainbow Falls, and Whitewater Falls, the tallest waterfall east of the Mississippi. It receives over 90 inches of rain annually due to orographic lift, making it the state's wettest county. (Buncombe County, 30 miles northeast, is the driest, as it sits in Transylvania County's rain shadow.) The Blue Ridge Parkway traverses parts of the county, and has views of the Appalachian Mountains, which reach over  elevation in the county. The highest point, Chestnut Knob, lies northwest of Brevard.

National protected areas 
 Blue Ridge Parkway (part)
 Nantahala National Forest (part)
 Pisgah National Forest (part)

State and local protected areas 
 Biltmore Forest School
 Bracken Preserve
 Camp Creek Falls
 Davidson River Recreational Area
 DuPont State Recreational Forest (part)
 Gorges State Park
 Headwaters State Forest
 Southern Highlands Reserve (part)
 Sycamore Flats Recreational Area

Major water bodies 
 Atagahi Lake
 Cascade Lake
 Dupont Lake
 French Broad River
 Horsepasture River
 Kings Creek
 Lake Jocassee
 Lake Julia
 Lake Toxaway
 Lake Wanteska
 Little River
 North Fork French Broad River
 Shoal Creek
 South Fork Flat Creek
 Thunder Lake
 Thompson River
 Ticoa Lake
 Toxaway Creek

Adjacent counties
 Henderson County - east
 Greenville County, South Carolina - southeast
 Pickens County, South Carolina - south
 Oconee County, South Carolina - southwest
 Jackson County - west
 Haywood County - northwest
 Buncombe County - northeast

Major highways

Demographics

2020 census

As of the 2020 United States census, there were 32,986 people, 14,567 households, and 9,978 families residing in the county.

2010 census
As of the census of 2010, there were 33,090 people, 14,394 households, and 8,660 families residing in the county.  The population density was 83 people per square mile (30/km2).  There were 15,553 housing units at an average density of 41 per square mile (16/km2).  The racial makeup of the county was 92.4% White, 3.9% Black or African American, 0.3% Native American, 0.4% Asian, and 1.12% from two or more races.  2.9% of the population were Hispanic or Latino of any race.

There were 12,320 households, out of which 25.10% had children under the age of 18 living with them, 58.60% were married couples living together, 8.70% had a female householder with no husband present, and 29.70% were non-families. 26.10% of all households were made up of individuals, and 12.40% had someone living alone who was 65 years of age or older.  The average household size was 2.30 and the average family size was 2.74.

In the county, the population was spread out, with 20.40% under the age of 18, 8.20% from 18 to 24, 23.10% from 25 to 44, 26.90% from 45 to 64, and 21.40% who were 65 years of age or older.  The median age was 44 years. For every 100 females there were 92.70 males.  For every 100 females age 18 and over, there were 89.50 males.

The median income for a household in the county was $38,587, and the median income for a family was $45,579. Males had a median income of $31,743 versus $21,191 for females. The per capita income for the county was $20,767.  About 6.60% of families and 9.50% of the population were below the poverty line, including 11.80% of those under age 18 and 7.00% of those age 65 or over.

Government and politics
At present Transylvania is a solidly Republican county, although much less so than the vast majority of Appalachia. No Democratic presidential nominee has carried Transylvania County since Jimmy Carter did so in 1976.

Transylvania County has a council-manager form of government, with a five-member Board of Commissioners elected at large. The Commissioners hire and supervise a separate County Manager. The current County Manager is Jaime Laughter. The current members of the Board of Commissioners are Jason Chappell (chairman), Jake Dalton (vice-chairman), Teresa McCall, Larry Chapman, and David Guice.

Transylvania Regional Hospital (TRH) was formed in 1933 with the mission to serve the community's health care needs. A 94-bed facility fully accredited by the Joint Commission on Accreditation of Healthcare Organizations (JCAHO), it has more than 120 active, consulting and courtesy physicians representing a full spectrum of specialties.

Transylvania County is a member of the Land-of-Sky Regional Council of governments.

The current mayor of Brevard is Maureen Copelof. The current mayor of Rosman is Brian Shelton.

Communities

City
 Brevard (county seat and largest city)

Town
 Rosman

Townships

 Boyd
 Brevard
 Cathey's Creek
 Dunn's Rock
 Eastatoe
 Gloucester
 Hogback
 Little River

Unincorporated communities

 Balsam Grove
 Cathey's Creek
 Cedar Mountain
 Connestee Falls
 Dunn's Rock
 Lake Toxaway
 Little River
 Penrose
 Pisgah Forest
 Quebec
 Sapphire

Points of interest

 Biltmore Forest School, first school of forestry in North America
 Blue Ridge Community College, Transylvania campus
 Blue Ridge Parkway
 Brevard College
 Brevard Little Theater
 Brevard Music Center
 DuPont State Forest
 Gorges State Park
 Lake Toxaway
 Looking Glass Falls
 Nantahala National Forest
 Pisgah Astronomical Research Institute
 Pisgah National Forest
 Sliding Rock
 Transylvania Arts Council
 Transylvania County Schools
 Whitewater Falls, highest waterfall in North Carolina

See also
 List of counties in North Carolina
 National Register of Historic Places listings in Transylvania County, North Carolina
 North Carolina State Parks
 List of North Carolina state forests
 National Park Service

References

External links

 
 
 Transylvania County Library
 Waterfalls in Transylvania County
 NCGenWeb Transylvania County - free genealogy resources for the county
 HendersonvilleNews.com - The Times-News Online

 
Counties of Appalachia
1861 establishments in North Carolina
Populated places established in 1861